The Lewisman was a named passenger train operating in the United Kingdom.

History
The service was introduced on 17 July 1933 by the London, Midland and Scottish Railway. Along with its companion, The Hebridean, it was a summer-only express between Inverness and the Kyle of Lochalsh connecting with steamers to the Isle of Skye and Stornoway. The Lewisman left the Kyle of Lochalsh at 5.00am, arriving in Inverness at 8.10am. A through coach for Glasgow was then attached to the 08.35am express for Glasgow, enabling a passenger to connect with the Mid-Day Scot to London. The Lewisman then departed Inverness at 10.15am with the addition of a restaurant car, and arrived in the Kyle of Lochalsh at 1.40pm.

After the Second World War, the Lewisman did not reappear.

References

Named passenger trains of the London, Midland and Scottish Railway
Rail transport in Scotland
Railway services introduced in 1933
1933 establishments in England